Lecithocera is a genus of moths in the lecithocerid subfamily Lecithocerinae. The genus was erected by Gottlieb August Wilhelm Herrich-Schäffer in 1853.

Species

Former species

References

Further reading
 , 2004: Catalog of the type specimens of Gelechioidea (Lepidoptera) in the collection of the National Museum of Natural History, Smithsonian Institution, Washington, DC. Zootaxa 510: 1–160. 
 , 2005: Eine neue Art der Familie Lecithoceridae aus der Türkei (Lepidoptera: Gelechioidea). Entomologische Nachrichten und Berichte 49: 127–128.
  1999: Lecithoceridae (Lepidoptera) of Taiwan (I): Subfamily Lecithocerinae: Genera Homaloxestis Meyrick and Lecithocera Herrich-Schäffer. Zoological studies, 38 (2): 238–256. PDF.
  2005: Genus Lecithocera Herrich-Schäffer of Thailand (I): Descriptions of Three New Species (Lepidoptera, Lecithoceridae). Journal of Asia-Pacific Entomology 8 (3): 233–237.
  2006: Genus Lecithocera of Thailand (II) Descriptions of four new species (Lepidoptera, Lecithoceridae). Tinea, 19 (2): 98-103.
  2006: Genus Lecithocera of Thailand (III): New records of five species of the genus (Lepidoptera, Lecithoceridae). Journal of Asia-Pacific entomology, 9 (4): 313–316.
  2009: Genus Lecithocera of Thailand. Part IV. Descriptions of three new species and notes on a little known species (Lepidoptera: Lecithoceridae). Zootaxa, 2208: 58–64. Abstract & excerpt.
 , 2012: Lecithoceridae (Lepidoptera: Gelechioidea) of New Guinea, Part VI: Lecithocera sublunata species complex. Entomological Science 15 (1): 68–73. .
 , 2012: Lecithoceridae (Gelechioidea, Lepidoptera) of New Guinea, Part X: Review of the genus Lecithocera with descriptions of ten new species. Journal of Asia-Pacific Entomology 15 (2): 313–327.
 , 2012: Lecithoceridae (Gelechioidea, Lepidoptera) of New Guinea Part X: Review of the genus Sarisophora, with descriptions of seven new species. Tropical Lepidoptera Research 22 (1): 8-15.
 , 2013: Two new species of Lecithoceridae (Lepidoptera, Gelechioidea), with a revised check list of the family in Taiwan. ZooKeys 263: 47–57. Abstract and full article: .
 , 1999: A review of the Lecithocerinae and Torodorinae (Lepidoptera: Lecithoceridae) in Korea. Insecta Koreana 16 (2): 119–129.
 , 2010: Genus Lecithocera of Thailand Part V, with reports of nine species including six new species (Lepidoptera: Lecithoceridae). Tropical Lepidoptera Research 20 (2): 62–70.
 , 1993: A study of the Chinese Lecithocera Herrich-Schaffer, 1853 and descriptions of new species (Lepidoptera:Lecithoceridae). Sinozoologia 10: 319–345. Full article: .
 , 1999: Taxonomic review of the Lecithoceridae (Lepidoptera) in Sri Lanka IV.The subfamily Lecithocerinae: genus Lecithocera Herrich-Schäffer and its allies. Insecta Koreana 16 (1): 1-14.

External links

 
Lecithocerinae
Moth genera
Taxa named by Gottlieb August Wilhelm Herrich-Schäffer